Nestorius Timanywa (7 May 1937 – 28 August 2018) was a Tanzanian Roman Catholic bishop.

Timanywa was born in Kakungiri Village, Bwanjai, Bukoba Tanzania and was ordained to the priesthood on 11 December 1966 in Bukoba Diocese, Kagera, Tanzania. On 26 November 1973 he was appointed Bishop of Bukoba and ordained on 24 February 1974. He served as bishop of the Roman Catholic Diocese of Bukoba, Tanzania, from 1974 to 15 January 2013 when he retired. Bishop Timanywa died on 28 August 2018 at Bugando Medical Centre, Mwanza.

Notes

1937 births
2018 deaths
20th-century Roman Catholic bishops in Tanzania
People from Bukoba
21st-century Roman Catholic bishops in Tanzania
Roman Catholic bishops of Bukoba